Antoinette Kirkwood (26 February 1930 - 28 January 2014) was an English composer born in London. She studied piano and composition with Dorothy Howell at the Royal Academy in London and often accompanied her mother, who was a lieder singer. For four years beginning in 1969, she was a member of  the Executive Committee of the Composers’ Guild of Great Britain, now the British Association of Composers and Songwriters. Radio Éireann broadcast her Symphony, op 8, composed in 1953. This “very notable achievement” established that Kirkwood “can write a memorable tune in a definite key” that will captivate the listener

Kirkwood married writer Richard Phibbs in 1961. Caring for her mother and husband through their terminal illnesses led to a complete cessation in her composition activity between 1961 and 1979. She died on 28 January 2014, aged 84.

Works
Kirkwood composed for ballet, symphony, ensembles and for solo instruments.  She composed two ballets, symphonic and orchestral works, chamber music 
and instrumental works. Selected works include:
Symphony No. 1 op. 8 (1953, recording at the British Music Collection
Alessandro op. 12 - (Music Drama after the book by Gerard McLarnon)
Musa the Saint op. 16 - (Ballet after the book by Antoinette Kirkwood)
Fantasia No. 1 op. 13
Fantasia No. 2 op. 14
Fantasia No. 3 op. 18
Suite for Strings op. 5
The Empty Stable op. 10 - Incidental Music
Unhallowed op. 4 - Incidental Music
Sonata op. 6 for Violoncello and Piano
Petite Suite op. 20 No. 2 for Guitar
Rapsodie No. 1 op. 21 No. 4 for Viola and Guitar
Soliloquy op. 19 No. 3 for Guitar
Largo op. 17 No. 1 for Flute and Piano
Rapsodie op. 19 No. 2 for Harp solo
Sleepy Waters in the Moonlight for 2 Violins and Violoncello
Sonatina op. 2 No. 1, piano
Nocturne op. 2 No. 2, piano
Carol SATB and piano
The Fly op. 7 No. 1 (William Blake)
The Barrel Organ op. 7 No. 5 (Michael Ashe)
Must she go? op. 9 No. 1 (James Forsyth)
Morning in Bengal op. 9 No. 2 (Anthony Hayward)
The Tourney op. 9 No. 3 (Anthony Hayward)
Remorse op. 9 No. 4 (Michael O'Hagan)
The Song of the Fisherman of Cacru op. 11 No. 3 (James Forsyth)
The Oyster-Catcher’s Song op. 11 No. 4 (James Forsyth)
Der Schiffbrüchige op. 15 (Heinrich Heine)
Krönung op. 17 No. 2 (Heinrich Heine) High Voice and Strings

Her works have been recorded and issued on media, including:
Six Intermezzi - A Potpourri of Piano Music
Sonata for Violoncello and Piano
Women Composers - Vol. I CD
Women Composers - Vol. II CD

References

1930 births
2014 deaths
20th-century classical composers
Women classical composers
English classical composers
Musicians from London
20th-century English composers
20th-century English women musicians
20th-century women composers